Daecheong Station is a station on the Seoul Subway Line 3. It is located in Irwon-dong, Gangnam-gu, Seoul, South Korea.

Station layout

Around the station
 Milal Museum of Art

References 

Seoul Metropolitan Subway stations
Metro stations in Gangnam District
Railway stations opened in 1993
Seoul Subway Line 3